Beltrees is an unincorporated community in southern Jersey County, Illinois, United States.

References

Unincorporated communities in Jersey County, Illinois
Unincorporated communities in Illinois